R. V. Udayakumar is an Indian film director and lyricist who worked predominantly in the Tamil film industry throughout the 1990s, making films including Yejaman and Chinna Gounder. He has also directed some Telugu films.

Early life
Udayakumar was born to an agricultural family in a village called Mollepalayam near Mettupalayam. His father is Venkatasamy and mother is Kannammal. He graduated with P. U. C from govt Arts and science College and studied BSc in Coimbatore. He joined the Madras Film Institute to pursue a diploma in direction. During the course, Udayakumar directed various short films.

Career

He worked as an associate director for films like Neram Vandhachu, Janani and Oomai Vizhigal. He made his directorial debut with Urimai Geetham starring Prabhu and Karthik. The film became successful and RM Veerappan provided him an opportunity to direct his second film Puthiya Vaanam, remake of Hindi film Hukumat. The film starred Sivaji Ganesan and Sathyaraj. He then directed Uruthimozhi. His fourth film Kizhakku Vasal became successful at the box office, the shooting of this film was plagued with various problems. The set which was built for the film was burnt, M. S. Madhu, storywriter of this film suffered from fits after witnessing the fire. Actress Sulakshana was admitted to hospital due to nose bleeding. RV Udayakumar was hospitalised due to car accident and he went into coma for one month. After recovery, Udayakumar completed the climax of the film. His next venture Chinna Gounder featured Vijayakanth as a soft-spoken village chieftain which was radically different from larger than life action roles which he was used to play, it was another successful film for both actor and director. He then directed Singaravelan with Kamal Haasan which also became successful.

After the success of Chinna Gounder, Udayakumar was approached by various producers but he was in confusion in selecting hero for his next film and then he decided to have Rajinikanth as hero for his next film. Rajini agreed to act under the direction of Udayakumar and Udayakumar expressed his interest to make this film for AVM Productions. Initially different script was narrated but Udaykumar later opted to film other script as AVM Saravanan felt that it might go over budget. Meena was selected as heroine, Rajini was initially reluctant to have her as heroine as she appeared as child artist for his film Anbulla Rajinikanth and he felt that his fans might not accept this combination but eventually Rajini agreed to do so. The success of Ejamaan meant that Udayakumar began a film titled Jilla Collecter with Rajinikanth, but the film was later cancelled. He again directed Ponnumani with Karthik which also became successful venture.

He then directed Prabhu's 100th film Rajakumaran which became a flop but featured a successful soundtrack. His subsequent films Nandhavana Theru starring Karthik and Subash starring Arjun became failure and average at box office respectively. He made his debut in Telugu with Tarakaramudu starring Srikanth and Soundarya, became a flop and was dubbed in Tamil as Velli Malare. He then began an incomplete film titled Ulagai Vilai Pesava with Karthik and Malavika, before completing a project called Chinna Ramasamy Periya Ramasamy with himself and Jayaram in leading roles. In spite of the soundtrack being released, the film remains unreleased. He was announced to direct Telugu remake of Nandha with Kalyanram which failed to proceed after launch. He then made a comeback with Karka Kasadara introducing actor Vijay's cousin Vikranth in lead role. The film flopped at box office and Udayakumar opted against directing films and started portraying supporting roles as an actor.

Filmography

As director

As actor
 Chinna Gounder (1992)
 Ponnumani (1993)
 Ejamaan (1993)
 Rajakumaran (1994)
 Chinna Ramasamy Periya Ramasamy (2000) – Unreleased
 Iru Nadhigal (2008)
 Sooriya Nagaram (2012)
 Pasanga 2 (2015)
 Anjala (2016)
 Thodari (2016)
 Devi (2016 - Multilingual)
 Paambhu Sattai (2017)
 Kelambitangaya Kelambitangaya (2018)
 100% Kadhal (2019)

As lyricist

References

Tamil film directors
Telugu film directors
Living people
M.G.R. Government Film and Television Training Institute alumni
Tamil film poets
20th-century Indian film directors
21st-century Indian film directors
People from Coimbatore district
Film directors from Tamil Nadu
Year of birth missing (living people)